Burning Palms is a 2010 American satirical thriller film written and directed by Christopher Landon (in his feature directorial debut) based on Los Angeles stereotypes told through five intertwining storylines.

The segments are based on popular stereotypes of West Hollywood, Santa Monica, Sherman Oaks, Westwood and Holmby Hills. Each of the characters in the film confronts taboos and an uncertain, often darkly humorous, fate. Producer Oren Segal likens the film to "a John Waters version of Short Cuts, a 1993 drama film directed by Robert Altman.

The film was released in the United States on January 14, 2011, by New Films International. It received negative reviews from critics.

Plot
 The Green-Eyed Monster
Dedra Davenport meets Chloe, the 15-year-old daughter of her fiancé Dennis for the very first time. However, she is soon disturbed by how close father and daughter are, committing suicide by cutting her veins just like Chloe's mother, feeling herself shut out and betrayed by the unhealthy close and bordering on incestuous relationship between the two.

 This Little Piggy
Ginny Bai agrees to participate in an unconventional sex act with her boyfriend Chad Bower. Soon after she begins to slowly lose her mind when she cannot seem to get rid of an odd smell from her finger.

 Buyer's Remorse
A rich and well-recognized West Hollywood gay couple decide to adopt a seven-year-old African girl. They prove to be mentally unprepared for the challenges and risks involved in parenthood, especially since she is a decided mute who refuses to speak to them, and abandon her.

 Kangaroo Court
A group of bullying, bratty boys, cared for by an irresponsible nanny are puzzled by their maid (Paz Vega) keeping the umbilical cord of her dead child and eventually discover that the maid murdered her own child to punish her boyfriend for infidelity.

 Maneater
An unidentified man breaks into the apartment of meek woman Sarah Cotton, and rapes her. Sometime later she finds the man's wallet and is able to track him down and approaches him, wanting him to rape her again.

Cast
Zoe Saldana as Sarah Cotton
Jamie Chung as Ginny Bai
Dylan McDermott as Dennis Marx
Rosamund Pike as Dedra Davenport
Lake Bell as Maryjane
Nick Stahl as Robert Kane
Paz Vega as Blanca Juarez
Adriana Barraza as Luisa Alvarez
Shannen Doherty as Dr. Shelly
Robert Hoffman as Chad Bower
Peter Macdissi as Geri
Anson Mount as Tom
Emily Meade as Chloe Marx
Jon Polito as The Pharmacist
Victor Webster as Paulo
Dimitri Diatchenko as Bob
Colleen Camp as Barbara Barish
Tom Wright as Maxwell Barron
Austin Williams as Nicholas Pinter
Chandler George Brown as Jeffrey

Production
Palms was scripted by Christopher Landon, who also wrote the 2007 thriller Disturbia. Palms also marks Landon's directorial debut.

Media outlets such as The Hollywood Reporter and Digital Spy reported that the ensemble-driven indie feature will star Shannen Doherty and Dylan McDermott as well as Zoe Saldana, Lake Bell, Nick Stahl, Paz Vega, Adriana Barraza, Colleen Camp, Jamie Chung, Robert Hoffman, Peter Macdissi, Emily Meade, Anson Mount, Rosamund Pike, Austin Williams, Chandler George Brown, and Tom Wright.

The film was shot in Los Angeles, California and Baton Rouge, Louisiana. Oren Segal, Steven Prince and Jason Hewitt produced the film, and Tyler Thompson, Vince Morella and Naz Jafri were executive producers.

Reception
To date, the critical reception for the film has been largely negative. One critic described the film as being "one of the most offensive movies I've seen in the past decade", going on to say:

Andrew Schenker of Slant magazine gave the film just half of one star out of a possible four. Writing of the film:

Gabe Callahan, of Poptimal.com, pointed out his theories as to why the film was such a disappointment:

Peter Debruge also denounced the film in Variety:

, the film holds a 38% approval rating on Rotten Tomatoes, based on eight reviews with an average rating of 4.56/10. On Metacritic, the film holds a score of 33 out of 100, based on five reviews, indicating "generally unfavorable reviews".

References

External links

American LGBT-related films
American anthology films
Films set in Los Angeles
Films about rape
Films directed by Christopher B. Landon
Films with screenplays by Christopher B. Landon
Films scored by Matthew Margeson
2010 directorial debut films
2010 films
2010s English-language films
2010s American films